The 2007 Fayetteville mayoral election took place on November 6, 2007 to elect the mayor of Fayetteville, North Carolina. It saw the reelection of incumbent mayor Tony Chavonne.

Results

References

2007
2007 North Carolina elections
2007 United States mayoral elections